Miserere is a choral work by Estonian composer Arvo Pärt. The work is set to two traditional liturgical hymns: the Miserere and the Dies irae. The piece begins with repeated pleas for mercy, interspersed with fateful pauses, until the day of wrath itself is ushered in by a thunderous drum-roll. The drum initiates each new verse, as the choir sings the most terrifying words in the Christian liturgy. Having confronted catastrophe, the choir ascends to radiant heights over the deep-throated resonance of the organ, tam-tam, and bell. Typically, performances last around 35 minutes. The work was composed in 1989/1992.

References

Choral compositions
Compositions by Arvo Pärt